Barack Obama, a Democrat from Illinois, was elected President of the United States on November 4, 2008 and was inaugurated as the nation's 44th president on January 20, 2009. Re-elected on November 6, 2012, his second inauguration was on January 20, 2013, and his presidency ended on January 20, 2017 with the inauguration of Donald Trump. The following articles cover the timeline of Obama's presidency, and the time leading up to it:

 Pre-presidency: 2007–2009
Barack Obama 2008 presidential campaign
Presidential transition of Barack Obama
 Presidency: 2009–2017
Timeline of the Barack Obama presidency (2009)
Timeline of the Barack Obama presidency (2010)
Timeline of the Barack Obama presidency (2011)
Timeline of the Barack Obama presidency (2012)
Timeline of the Barack Obama presidency (2013)
Timeline of the Barack Obama presidency (2014)
Timeline of the Barack Obama presidency (2015)
Timeline of the Barack Obama presidency (2016–2017)

See also
 Timeline of the George W. Bush presidency, for his predecessor
 Timeline of the Donald Trump presidency, for his successor

Obama, Barack
Presidency of Barack Obama